The 2009–10 OFC Champions League, also known as the 2010 O-League for short, was the 9th edition of the Oceanian Club Championship, Oceania's premier club football tournament organized by the Oceania Football Confederation (OFC), and the 4th season under the current OFC Champions League name. It was contested by eight teams from seven countries. The teams were split into two four-team pools, the winner of each pool contesting the title of O-League Champion and the right to represent the OFC at the 2010 FIFA Club World Cup. This was an expansion from previous tournaments which feature six teams in the group stage.

The tournament was won by Hekari United of Papua New Guinea. They became the first team from outside New Zealand and Australia to be crowned Oceanian club champion.

Participants

Group stage
Winners of each group advance to the final.

Group A

Group B

Final

The two group winners will play-off over two legs to determine the 2009–10 OFC Champions League winners.

 

Hekari United won 4–2 on aggregate. As OFC Champions League winners they qualify for the qualifying round of the 2010 FIFA Club World Cup.

Topscorers

As of 2 May 2010.

 32 single goal scorers
 2 own goals scored

References

External links
OFC Champions League

OFC Champions League seasons
1